Ouija House is an  American supernatural horror film directed by Ben Demaree. The film stars Tara Reid, Mischa Barton, Carly Schroeder and Dee Wallace. The film premiered at the Texas Frightmare Weekend on May 5, 2018.

Plot summary
A graduate student trying to complete her book on the paranormal, brings friends to a house with a mysterious past, where the group unwittingly summon an evil entity playing a terrifying game.

Cast
 Dee Wallace as Katherine
Tara Reid as Young Katherine
 Mischa Barton as Samantha
 Carly Schroeder as Laurie
 Chris Mulkey as Tomas
 Tiffany Shepis as Claire

References

External links
 

2018 films
American supernatural horror films
American ghost films
American horror thriller films
2018 horror thriller films
2010s supernatural films
Films about board games
Films based on games
2010s English-language films
Films directed by Ben Demaree
2010s American films